Central Adams is an unorganized territory in Adams County, North Dakota, United States. As of the 2010 census it had a population of 54.
Central Adams comprises the territory of the former townships of Holt and Argonne.

References

Populated places in Adams County, North Dakota